Gadolinium(III) hydroxide is a chemical compound with the formula Gd(OH)3. Its nanoparticles has a potential use for layering various drugs, such as diclofenac, ibuprofen, and naproxen.

Production and properties
Gadolinium(III) hydroxide can be produced in various ways such as the reaction of gadolinium(III) nitrate and sodium hydroxide:
Gd(NO3)3 + NaOH → Gd(OH)3 + NaNO3
If this compound is heated to 307 °C, it decomposes to gadolinium(III) oxide-hydroxide(GdOOH), which in turn decomposes to gadolinium(III) oxide if continually heated.

Uses
Gadolinium(III) hydroxide has no commercial uses. However, gadolinium(III) hydroxide nanoparticles have gained interest as a coating agent for various anti-inflammatory drugs such as diclofenac, ibuprofen, and naproxen due to their property to be non-cytotoxic. The nanoparticles are produced by adding base anion exchange resin to gadolinium(III) nitrate.

References

Gadolinium compounds
Hydroxides